The Olympia School, also known as the Picture City School, the Hobe Sound White School, the Apollo Street School and now the Apollo School, is an historic two-room elementary school building located at 9141 Southeast Apollo Street in Hobe Sound, Martin County, Florida. On December 20, 2002, it was added to the U.S. National Register of Historic Places. The school closed in 1963 upon the opening of the Hobe Sound Elementary School on Gomez Avenue. The building is in the process of being restored by the Apollo School Foundation, Inc.

References

 Martin County listings at National Register of Historic Places

Hobe Sound, Florida
Public elementary schools in Florida
Schools in Martin County, Florida
National Register of Historic Places in Martin County, Florida
School buildings on the National Register of Historic Places in Florida